Publications by or about George Winterton, Australian legal scholar.

Books

 Winterton, G, Monarchy to Republic: Australian Republican Government, Oxford University Press, 1986 (rev ed, 1994).
 Lee, HP & Winterton, G (eds), Australian Constitutional Perspectives, Law Book Co., 1992.
 Winterton, G (ed), We, the People: Australian Republican Government, Allen & Unwin, 1994.
 Winterton, G, Judicial Remuneration in Australia, Australian Institute of Judicial Administration, 1995.
 Winterton, G, Lee, HP, Glass, A & Thomson, JA, Australian Federal Constitutional Law: Commentary and Materials, LBC, 1999.
 Lee, HP & Winterton, G (eds), Australian Constitutional Landmarks, Cambridge University Press, 2003.
 Winterton, G (ed), State Constitutional Landmarks, Federation Press, 2006.
 Winterton, G, Lee, HP, Glass, A & Thomson, JA, Australian Federal Constitutional Law: Commentary and Materials, 2nd ed., Lawbook Co., 2007.

Monographs
 Winterton, G, The Resurrection of the Republic, Law and Policy Paper 15, Centre for International and Public Law, ANU (2001).

Chapters in books
 Winterton, G, "An Australian Rights Council" in T Campbell, J Goldsworthy & A Stone (eds), Protecting Rights Without a Bill of Rights: Institutional Performance and Reform in Australia, Ashgate Publlishing Limited: Aldershot, England (2006), 305–317.
 Winterton, G, "Australian States: Cinderellas No Longer?" in G Winterton (ed) State Constitutional Landmarks, The Federation Press: Sydney (2006), 1-20.
 Winterton, G, "The Evolving Role of the Australian Governor-General" in M Groves (ed), Law and Government in Australia, Federation Press (2005), 44–58.
 Winterton, G, "The High Court and Federalism: A Centenary Evaluation" in P Cane (ed), Centenary Essays for the High Court of Australia, LexisNexis Butterworths (2004), 197–220.
 Winterton, G, "A Model for Electing the Australian President" in W Hudson & A J Brown (eds), Restructuring Australia, Federation Press (2004), 124–139.
 Winterton, G, "The Communist Party Case" in HP Lee & G Winterton (eds), Australian Constitutional Landmarks, Cambridge University Press (2003), 108–144.
 Winterton, G, "1975: The Dismissal of the Whitlam Government" in HP Lee & G Winterton (eds), Australian Constitutional Landmarks, Cambridge University Press (2003), 229–261.
 Winterton, G, "The Acquisition of Independence" in R French, G Lindell & C Saunders (eds), Reflections on the Australian Constitution, Federation Press (2003), 31–50.
 Winterton, G, "The Role of the Governor" in C Macintyre & J Williams (eds), Peace, Order and Good Government, Wakefield Press (2003), 209–225.
 Winterton, G, "Presidential Powers under Direct Election" in J Warhurst & M Mackerras (eds), Constitutional Politics: The Republic Referendum and the Future, University of Queensland Press (2002), 227–236.
 Winterton, G, "Barwick, Garfield Edward John" in T Blackshield, M Coper & G Williams (eds), The Oxford Companion to the High Court of Australia, Oxford University Press (2001), 56–58.
 Winterton, G, "Remuneration of Justices" in T Blackshield, M Coper & G Williams (eds), The Oxford Companion to the High Court of Australia, Oxford University Press (2001), 596–598.
 Winterton, G, "Constitutional Convention 1998 and the Future of Constitutional Reform" in GA Moens (ed), Constitutional and International Law Perspectives, University of Queensland Press: Brisbane (2000), 151–164.
 Winterton, G, "A New Zealand Republic" in A Simpson (ed), The Constitutional Implications of MMP, Dunmore Press (1998), 204–231.
 Winterton, G, "Popular Sovereignty and Constitutional Continuity" in C Sampford & C-A Bois (eds), Sir Zelman Cowen: A Life in the Law, Federation Press (1997), 42–61.
 Winterton, G, "The President: Adapting to Popular Election" in M Coper & G Williams (eds), Power, Parliament and the People, Federation Press (1997), 23–41.
 Winterton, G, "Introduction" in WH Moore, The Constitution of the Commonwealth of Australia, Legal Books (reprint, 1997); (2nd ed, 1910), v-lxix.
 Winterton, G, "Constitutionally Entrenched Common Law Rights: Sacrificing Means to Ends?" in C Sampford & K Preston (eds), Interpreting Constitutions: Theories, Principles and Institutions, Federation Press (1996), 121–145.
 Winterton, G, "Limits to the Use of the Treaty Power" in P Alston & M Chiam (eds), Treaty-Making and Australia: Globalisation versus Sovereignty?, Federation Press (1995), 29–51.
 Winterton, G, "A Framework for Reforming the External Affairs Power" in Upholding the Australian Constitution, vol.5: Proceedings of the Fifth Conference of The Samuel Griffith Society, (1995), 17–46.
 Winterton, G, "The Separation of Judicial Power as an Implied Bill of Rights" in G Lindell (ed), Future Directions in Australian Constitutional Law, Federation Press (1994), 185–208.
 Winterton, G, "The Constitutional Implications of a Republic" in MA Stephenson & C Turner (eds), Australia: Republic or Monarchy?, University of Queensland Press (1994), 15–33.
 Winterton, G, "A Constitution for an Australian Republic" in G Winterton (ed), We, the People: Australian Republican Government, Allen & Unwin (1994), 1-37.
 Winterton, G, "A Republican Constitution" in G Winterton (ed), We, the People: Australian Republican Government, Allen & Unwin (1994), 38–48.
 Winterton, G, "The Constitutional Position of Australian State Governors" in HP Lee & G Winterton (eds), Australian Constitutional Perspectives, Law Book Co. (1992), 274–335.
 Winterton, G, "Dissolving the Communists: The Communist Party Case and its Significance" in Seeing Red: The Communist Party Dissolution Act and Referendum 1951: Lessons for Constitutional Reform, Evatt Foundation (1992), 133–178.

Contribution to government reports
 Republic Advisory Committee, An Australian Republic: The Options (2 vols., AGPS, 1993).
 Constitutional Commission, Executive Government Advisory Committee, Report (AGPS, 1987).

Articles
 Winterton, G, 'Who is our Head of State' (September 2004) Quadrant 60–63.
 Winterton, G, 'The Relationship Between Commonwealth Legislative and Executive Power' (2004) 25(1) Adelaide Law Review 21–50.
 Winterton, G, 'The Limits and Use of Executive Power by Government' (2003) 31 Federal Law Review 421–444.
 Winterton, G, 'The Evolving Role of the Governor-General' (March 2004) Quadrant 42–46.
 Winterton, G, 'The Hollingworth Experiment' (2003) 14 Public Law Review 139–147.
 Winterton, G, 'Justice Kirby's Coda in Durham' (2002) 13 Public Law Review 165–170.
 Winterton, G, 'Six Republican Models for Australia' (2001) 12 Public Law Review 241–245.
 Winterton, G, 'A Directly Elected President: Maximising Benefits and Minimising Risks' (2001) 3 University of Notre Dame Australia Law Review 27–44.
 Winterton, G, 'An Australian Rights Council' (2001) 24 University of New South Wales Law Journal 792–799.
 Winterton, G, 'Con Con 1998 and the Future of Constitutional Reform' (1999) 20 University of Queensland Law Journal 225–234.
 Winterton, G, 'Presidential Removal Under the Convention Model' (1999) 10 Public Law Review 58–64.
 Winterton, G, 'The 1998 Convention: A Reprise of 1898?' (1998) 21 University of New South Wales Law Journal 856–867.
 Winterton, G, 'Popular Sovereignty and Constitutional Continuity' (1998) 26 Federal Law Review 1–13.
 Winterton, G, 'Barwick the Judge' (1998) 21 University of New South Wales Law Journal 109–116.
 Winterton, G, 'Australia's Constitutional Convention 1998' (1998) 5 Agenda 97–109.
 Winterton, G, 'Should the High Court Consider Policy?' (1998) 57 Australian Journal of Public Administration 73–76.
 Winterton, G, 'An Australian Republic' (Summer 1998) NIRA Review 30–33.
 Winterton, G, 'A New Constitutional Preamble' (1997) 8 Public Law Review 186–194.
 Winterton, G, 'Barwick the Judge' (October 1997) Quadrant 25–29.
 Winterton, G, 'The States and the Republic: A Constitutional Accord?' (1995) 6 Public Law Review 107–130.

 Winterton, G, 'Choosing a Republican Head of State' (1995) 2 Agenda 135–147.
 Winterton, G, 'Presidential Reserve Powers in an Australian Republic' (1994) 8(2) Legislative Studies 47–55.
 Winterton, G, 'The Evolution of a Separate Australian Crown' (1993) 19 Monash University Law Review 1-22.
 Winterton, G, 'Presidential Power in Republican Australia' (1993) 28 Australian Journal of Political Science 40–55.
 Winterton, G, 'Reserve Powers in an Australian Republic' (1993) 12 University of Tasmania Law Review 249–262.
 Winterton, G, 'On the Road to the Republic' (1993) 1(2) Evatt Papers 45–54.
 Winterton, G, 'Tasmania's Hung Parliament' (1992) Public Law 423–451.
 Winterton, G, 'The Significance of the Communist Party Case' (1992) 18 Melbourne University Law Review 630–658.
 Winterton, G, 'Modern Republicanism' (1992) 6(2) Legislative Studies 24–26.
 Winterton, G, 'A Constitution for an Australian Republic' (March 1992) Independent Monthly, 15pp.
 Winterton, G, 'Formula for a Presidency' (March 1992) Independent Monthly.
 Winterton, G, 'An Australian Republic' (1988) 16 Melbourne University Law Review 466–481.
 Winterton, G, 'Judicial Ethics in Australia' (1988) 11 University of New South Wales Law Journal 220–227.
 Winterton, G, 'Constitutional Reform' (September 1988) Quadrant 20–23.
 Winterton, G, 'Judges as Royal Commissioners' (1987) 10 University of New South Wales Law Journal 108–126.
 Winterton, G, 'Appointment of Federal Judges in Australia' (1987) 16 Melbourne University Law Review 185–212.
 Winterton, G, 'Another Bicentenary: The Influence of the United States Constitution in Australia' (March 1988) Quadrant, 5–7.
 Winterton, G, 'Extra-Constitutional Notions in Australian Constitutional Law' (1986) 16 Federal Law Review 223–239.
 Winterton, G, "The Limits of Constitutional Law", in Law and Australian Legal Thinking in the 1980s: Australian Contributions to the 12th International Congress of Comparative Law (1986), 477–496.
 Winterton, G, 'Comment on Section 51(xx) of the Constitution' (1984) 14 Federal Law Review 258–265.
 Winterton, G, 'The Third Man: Sir Garfield Barwick' (April 1984) Quadrant 23–26.
 Winterton, G, 'Pre-Acquisition Imperial Statutes and the Repugnancy Doctrine' (1984) 14 Hong Kong Law Journal 67–71.
 Winterton, G, 'The Prerogative in Novel Situations' (1983) 99 Law Quarterly Review 407–411.
 Winterton, G, Opinion on Conventions Governing the Governor-General's Reserve Powers, Australian Constitutional Convention, 1983, 16 pp.
 Winterton, G, 'Section 51(xxxviii) of the Constitution and Amendment of the `Covering Clauses`' (1982) 5 University of New South Wales Law Journal 327–330.
 Winterton, G, 'The Act of Settlement and the Employment of Aliens' (1981) 12 Federal Law Review 212-235 (co-author).
 Winterton, G, 'Parliamentary Supremacy and the Judiciary' (1981) 97 Law Quarterly Review 265–274.
 Winterton, G, 'Comments on the Integration Debate in the United States' (1981) 18 Bulletin of the Australian Society of Legal Philosophy 40–47.
 Winterton, G, 'Can the Commonwealth Parliament Enact `Manner and Form' Legislation?' (1980) 11 Federal Law Review 167-202.
 Winterton, G, 'The Concept of Extra-Constitutional Executive Power in Domestic Affairs' (1979) 7 Hastings Constitutional Law Quarterly 1-46.
 Winterton, G, 'Is the House of Lords Immortal?' (1979) 95 Law Quarterly Review 386-392.
 Winterton, G, 'The British Grundnorm: Parliamentary Supremacy Re-examined' (1976) 92 Law Quarterly Review 591-617.
 Winterton, G, 'The Legal Regime of the Sea-Bed Under the New International Economic Order' (1976) 2 Columbia Journal of Environmental Law 399-412.
 Winterton, G, 'Comparative Law Teaching' (1975) 23 American Journal of Comparative Law 69-118.
 Winterton, G, 'Comparative Law in the Non-Western Nations: A Brief Survey' (1975) 12 University of Western Australia Law Review 48-63.
 Winterton, G, 'Consideration Provided by One of Two Joint Promisees' (1969) 47 Canadian Bar Review 493-505.
 Winterton, G, 'Is an Agreement to Agree Unenforceable?' (1969) 9 University of Western Australia Law Review 83-96.

Additional publications
 "An Australian Judicial Remuneration Tribunal" (2005) 8 Constitutional Law and Policy Review 65–66.
 "Judges' Pay Mess Needs to be Sorted", The Australian, 14 October 2005.
 "Popular Sovereignty Requires Informed Voters" in Educating for Democracy: Constitution Education Fund Australia 2004/2005 Annual Report, 15–16.
 "The ACT Bill of Rights" (2004) 7 Constitutional Law and Policy Review 47–48.
 "Rights Code Test", Lawyers Weekly, 30 July 2004, 11.
 "The Centenary of the High Court" (2004) 6 Constitutional Law and Policy Review 82.
 "Once Distrusted by the Left, Now Mistrusted by the Right", The Australian, 8 October 2003.
 "Interviews by the Attorney-General in Appointing Judges" (2003) 5 Constitutional Law and Policy Review 68.
 "Lessons from the Hollingworth Affair", Democratic Audit of Australia, Australian National University (https://web.archive.org/web/20130513202332/http://democratic.audit.anu.edu.au/).
 "Lessons for the Learning from an Unhappy Affair", Sydney Morning Herald, 26 May 2003.
 "Echoes of 1975 as Holes in the Constitution are Exposed", Sydney Morning Herald, 14 May 2003.
 "No Room for Secrecy in Judicial Appointment Process", Weekend Australian Financial Review, 14–15 December 2002.
 "A crisis, but not of Kerr Proportions", The Australian, 25 February 2002.
 "Defending the Court", in Keeping the Show Together: The Federalism Forums 2001 (E. Thompson ed., January 2002), 52–53.
 "The New Republic", The Age, 12 July 2001.
 "No Cause for Open Comment", The Australian, 4 May 2001.
 "The Way Forward for Federalism", Australian Financial Review, 15 January 2001.
 "Rights of Passage", The Bulletin, 19 December 2000 – 2 January 2001, 42–43.
 "Voting for Change Will Create a Superior System", Australian Financial Review, 5 November 1999.
 "The President Dismisses the Prime Minister", "An Election Returns a Hung Parliament" and "The Senate Blocks the Budget", Weekend Australian, 30–31 October 1999.
 "Model Should Be Tested First With a Poll for Governor", Sydney Morning Herald, 26 October 1999.
 "A Feast of Possibilities", Weekend Australian, 9–10 October 1999.
 "Safety, Not Perfection, the Key Question", Weekend Australian, 7–8 August 1999.
 "A Popular Republic That Works", The Australian, 29 December 1997.
 "A Reply to McGarvie", Adelaide Review, November 1997, 16–17.
 "A Dilemma We Can't Dismiss", Weekend Australian, 15–16 November 1997.
 "Neither Fish nor Fowl" (review of T. Abbott, How to Win the Constitutional War), Adelaide Review, December 1997, 22–23.
 "The Election of an Australian President", in Poets, Presidents, People and Parliament: Republicanism and Other Issues (Papers on Parliament No. 28, Department of the Senate, Canberra, November 1996), 12–17, 21–22.
 "Murphy: A Maverick Reconsidered", The Australian, 21 October 1996, reprinted (1997) 20 University of New South Wales Law Journal 204–207.
 "State Charters Riddled with Omissions and Inconsistencies", The Australian, 29 March 1996.
 "Free Speech Rights and Voting Wrongs", The Age, 23 February 1996.
 "Constitutional Reform", Quadrant, December 1995, 51–52.
 "Sacking Highlights Dangers of Brinkmanship", Weekend Australian, 11–12 November 1995.
 "Matters for Argument" (Review of G. Barwick, A Radical Tory), The Age, 12 August 1995.
 "Some Reforms are Clearly Needed", Constitutional Centenary Foundation (Vic.) Newsletter, Winter 1995.
 "A Model President", Weekend Australian, 10–11 June 1995.
 "The Crucial Choice", Weekend Australian, 11–12 March 1995.
 "Fixed State Funding Should Guarantee Republican Dividend", The Australian, 20 September 1994.
 "The Power of the Covenant", The Australian, 29 August 1994 (co-author).
 "Education Vital to Machinery of Democracy", The Australian, 19 May 1994.
 "Change Must be Slow, Gradual", Weekend Australian, 9–10 October 1993.
 "Removing the Crown with Light Fingers", The Australian, 11 August 1993.
 "Binding a Republic and its Constitution", The Age, 1 May 1993.
 "How to Create the Republic of Australia", The Australian, 26 February 1993.
 "Lessons But No Scars from the Dismissal", The Australian, 1 April 1992.
 "President - and a Question of Power", Herald-Sun (Melbourne), 8 April 1992.
 "Choosing a President", Herald-Sun (Melbourne), 7 April 1992.
 "No Hereditary Barriers to Coming of Age in the Pacific", The Australian, 23 September 1991.
 Review of H. Evans, Constitutionalism and Party Government in Australia (1989) 59 Canberra Bulletin of Public Administration 109–110.
 Review of G. Marshall, Constitutional Conventions (1986) 102 Law Quarterly Review 337–341.
 Comment, in Restraining Leviathan: Small Government in Practice (1987), 331–333.
 "Local Government - Leave Well Alone", The Australian, 25 May 1988.
 "For Mitterrand, It's Almost Deja Vu", The Australian, 12 May 1988.
 "More Power to Canberra", The Age, 11 December 1986.
 "Caught in a Game of Regal Schizophrenia, the Queen Holds the Losing Cards", The Australian, 18 July 1986.
 "The Case for Tinkering with the Constitution", The Australian, 7 August 1985.
 "Australia's Bill of Rights", The Australian, 28 December 1984.
 "The Most Centralist High Court Since Federation", The Australian, 4 July 1983.
 "Settling the Powers of the Governor-General", The Age, 26 April 1983.
 "Sir Ninian: No Row Over Dissolution", The Age, 29 July 1982.

Sources

Bibliographies by writer
Bibliographies of Australian writers